Fresh Wine for the Horses is the debut studio album by English singer-songwriter, former Catherine Wheel frontman Rob Dickinson. Released in 2005, it features tracks that Dickinson wrote while a member of Catherine Wheel but never made it onto official releases, as well as new material written since the band's breakup in 2000.  The album received mixed reviews from the media, but was met with enthusiastic approval by longtime fans of the band.  The release was supported by a tour of small venues across the United States and Canada, where Dickinson performed intimate acoustic sets comprising both Catherine Wheel and solo material. In 2008, the album was reissued as two disc edition with EP titled Nude, consists of acoustic version of Catherine Wheel tracks, and a slight changing of tracklist from the original release, with the addition of previously unreleased song called "The End of the World".

Track listings

Original Version
"My Name Is Love" – 4:08
"Oceans" – 4:19
"The Night" – 4:17
"Mutineer" (Warren Zevon) – 1:02 
"Intelligent People" – 5:20
"Handsome" – 5:16
"Bathe Away" – 4:07
"The Storm" – 3:38
"Bad Beauty" – 5:30
"Don't Change" – 5:42
"Towering and Flowering" – 6:17

2008 Reissue

Personnel

Musicians
Rob Dickinson – vocals, guitar, piano, organ, harmonica, drums
David Rolfe – guitar, piano, bass guitar, drums
Greg Collins – bass guitar
Paul Umbach – guitar, bass guitar, drums
Tim Friese-Greene – bass guitar
Marty Willson-Piper – guitar
Brian Futter – guitar, vocals
David Lavita – guitar
Lawrence Katz – guitar
Bruce Witken – upright bass
Neil Sims – drums, percussion
Bill Lefler – drums
Ryan Macmillan – drums
Bryan Mcleod – drums
Butch – drums
Tracy Bonham – violin
Mike Farrel – trumpet, organ
Peter Adams – keyboards
Dick Robinson Spiritual Suite, Lonnie Love, April Hoffman – backing vocals

Production
Rob Dickinson – producer
David Rolfe – producer, mixing
Paul Umbach – producer
Greg Collins – producer
Ross Hogarth – mixing
Jennifer Broussard – photography

References

Rob Dickinson albums
2005 debut albums
Sanctuary Records albums